Micromandibularia is a genus of longhorn beetles of the subfamily Lamiinae, containing the following species:

 Micromandibularia atrimembris (Pic, 1936)
 Micromandibularia rufa Breuning, 1954
 Micromandibularia ruficeps Pic, 1936

References

Saperdini